West Indies Salad is a variation of crab meat ceviche that originated in the Mobile, Alabama area and is still a regional seafood delicacy enjoyed today. West Indies salad was created by the restaurateur William "Bill" Bayley, Sr., the owner of Bayley's Steak House south of Mobile on Dauphin Island Parkway, in 1947. Per the first source, he was inspired while working as a ship steward on a ship docked in the Cayman Islands. In 2022, due to staffing issues, Bayley's announced its closure.

Bayley's Seafood Restaurant Closure Controversy

After the closure announcement was posted on Facebook, the post went viral in antiwork social media groups who claimed that Bayley's claim to the West Indies Salad is false and that he stole the recipe from an unnamed local woman, but this claim has very little evidence to prove its validity.  There are variations of the recipe,  but the ingredients should always include lump blue crab meat, diced sweet white onions, cider vinegar, salt, pepper, and vegetable oil (traditionally Wesson oil). There are recipes in the cookbook of the Junior League of Mobile (first published in the 1964 version of this cookbook) and the recently in the Times Picayune of New Orleans. The dish is offered in many restaurants in the Mobile Bay area.

See also

 List of crab dishes
 List of seafood dishes

References

Crab dishes
Uncooked fish dishes